The Treaty of Haddington was a treaty signed in 1548 between France and Scotland that promised Mary, Queen of Scots to Dauphin Francis in marriage in return for French assistance in the Siege of Haddington and subsequent French influence in Scotland.  Mary, only six years old at the time, subsequently went to live in France, eventually marrying the Dauphin, while her regents ruled in her name in Scotland.

The treaty was negotiated by the Earl of Arran, who earned a French duchy for himself in the process.

References

Treaties of Scotland
Treaties of the Kingdom of France
Mary, Queen of Scots
1548 in Scotland
1548 in France
Auld Alliance
1548 treaties